Komitak (also Romanized as Komītak; also known as Kumītak) is a village in Kaveh Ahangar Rural District, in the Central District of Chadegan County, Isfahan Province, Iran. At the 2006 census, its population was 716, in 186 families.

References 

Populated places in Chadegan County